Sebastiano Finardi (born 20 February 2001) is an Italian professional footballer who plays as a midfielder for  club Turris, on loan from Atalanta.

Club career
Born in Milan, Finardi started his career in the Atalanta youth system. On 9 September 2020, he was loaned to Serie C club Giana Erminio.

On 26 August 2021, he was loaned to Turris in Serie C.

Finardi rejoined Turris on another season-long loan on 15 July 2022.

International career
Finardi was youth international for Italy on U-15 and U-16 teams between 2016 and 2017.

References

External links

2001 births
Living people
Footballers from Milan
Italian footballers
Association football midfielders
Serie C players
Atalanta B.C. players
A.S. Giana Erminio players
S.S. Turris Calcio players
Italy youth international footballers